Jagatballavpur is a census town in Jagatballavpur CD Block in Howrah Sadar subdivision of Howrah district in the Indian state of West Bengal.

Geography

Demographics
As per 2011 Census of India Jagatballavpur had a total population of 7,113 of which 3,636 (51%) were males and 3,477 (49%) were females. Population below 6 years was 786. The total number of literates in Jagatballavpur was 5,240 (82.82% of the population over 6 years).

Transport
Jagatballavpur is a junction of five roads which lead to Bargachia, Munsirhat, Masat, Jangipara and Udaynarayanpur.

Bus

Government bus
E13 Esplanade - Jangipara
E32 Kolkata - Antpur
E71 Esplanade  - Udaynarayanpur
E72 Esplanade - Jangipara
E77 Esplanade- Sukanta park
SBSTC Kolkata - Rajbalhat

Private bus
 26C Jagatballavpur - Bonhooghly

Bus Route without number
 Udaynarayanpur - Howrah Station
 Rajbalhat - Howrah Station
 Tarakeswar - Howrah Station

Train
Bargachia railway station and Pantihal railway station on Howrah-Amta line are the nearest railway station of Jagatballavpur.

Local Transportation
The local transportation of Jagatballavpur is also properly maintained by Tracker and also many routes of autos.

References

Cities and towns in Howrah district